The Man Who Returns from Afar (French: L'homme qui revient de loin) is a 1950 French thriller film directed by Jean Castanier and starring Annabella, Paul Bernard and María Casares. It is based on the 1916 novel of the same title by Gaston Leroux.

The film's sets were designed by Maurice Colasson.

Cast
 Annabella as Fanny de la Bossière  
 Paul Bernard as Jacques de la Bossière  
 María Casares as Marthe Saint-Firmin  
 Daniel Lecourtois as Le docteur Moutier  
 Jacques Servières as André Munda de la Bossière  
 Édouard Delmont as Prosper  
 France Ellys as Mademoiselle Hélier  
 Henri Crémieux as Le notaire Saint-Firmin 
 Marius David 
 Pierre Duncan 
 Claude Garbe 
 Michel Seldow 
 Solange Sicard

References

Bibliography 
 Goble, Alan. The Complete Index to Literary Sources in Film. Walter de Gruyter, 1999.

External links 
 

1950s thriller drama films
French thriller drama films
1950 films
1950s French-language films
Films based on French novels
Films based on works by Gaston Leroux
Remakes of French films
Sound film remakes of silent films
1950 drama films
French black-and-white films
1950s French films